Harvey Davies (born 3 September 2003) is an English professional footballer who plays for Liverpool as a goalkeeper.

Career
Davies joined the Liverpool academy from under-nine level. Following an injury crisis he was named on the substitute bench for UEFA Champions League matches against Red Bull Salzburg and both legs of the quarter-final against Real Madrid during the 2020-21 season. He signed a first professional contract aged 17 in 2021. He signed a new contract with the club in July 2022. Davies was included in the pre-season first team training camps and tour of the Far East in the summer of 2022, playing in a pre-season friendly against Crystal Palace in Singapore.

International career
Davies was part of the England national under-19 football team that won the 2022 UEFA European Under-19 Championship held in Slovakia in June and July 2022. In September 2020 he was called up to the England U20 team.

Honours
Liverpool FC
FA Community Shield: 2022

England under-19
UEFA European Under-19 Championship: 2022

References

2003 births
Living people
Footballers from Liverpool
English footballers
England youth international footballers
Association football goalkeepers
Liverpool F.C. players